Let's Say for Instance is the fourth studio album by Scottish singer Emeli Sandé, released on 6 May 2022 through Chrysalis Records. It is Sandé's first release with Chrysalis, and first album on an independent record label. The album was preceded by the release of the singles "Family", "Look What You've Done" (with Jaykae), "Brighter Days" and "There Isn't Much".

Background and musical style
Sandé explained that she "felt free to express [her]self more naturally both lyrically and musically in this album and [her] wish is that it will be an uplifting experience for each listener and that they will get to know [her] on a much deeper level". Upon release in September 2021, lead single "Family" was called a departure from Sandé's previous soul sound "more towards pop", while a press release accompanying the album announcement claimed Sandé "explor[es] new sonic territory through shades of classical, disco, [and] nostalgic R&B".

Promotion
Lead single "Family" was released on 15 September 2021, followed by the Jaykae duet "Look What You've Done" the next month, and "Brighter Days" in January 2022. The album was announced on 15 February 2022. Sandé will promote the album on the Brighter Days Tour, which will visit the UK and Europe across May and June 2022.

Critical reception

Fiona Shepherd of The Scotsman rated the album three out of five stars and wrote that "Sandé may talk about soul-baring through her songs but there is an opaqueness to the off-the-peg inspirational messages in her lyrics which allows the listener to project their own experiences into her middle-of-the-road songs". Shepherd felt the track "Brighter Days" sounds like "Dolly Parton in gospel robes" and called "Look in Your Eyes" a "tasteful, mid-paced reverie" with "old school Terry Lewis/Jimmy Jam-style soul funk". Reviewing the album for musicOMH, Martyn Young opined that it "feels like an album perfectly designed for the playlist age [...] even if as a whole work it could do with paring down". He also called it "a record that highlights a gifted songwriter and producer doing what they love and being gently experimental with it", remarking that Sandé is "free from the expectations and pressures of cultural ubiquity", thus she "can carry on doing what she's very good at".

Writing for PopMatters, Peter Piatkowski called the songs on the album "for the most part, smart, uplifting pop songs with the kind of inspirational lyrics that would soothe a wide variety of adversarial circumstances", praising the album's "pleasingly diverse sound" and lyrics "which sound as if they've come from a lifetime of experience", akin to a "boxed set of the best episodes from The Oprah Winfrey Show". Piatkowski further wrote that "Sandé's warmth dominates the record and her songs are like a loving embrace", calling Let's Say for Instance "the soul album we need in these struggle-filled cultural-political times".

Track listing

Personnel
Musicians

 Emeli Sandé – vocals
 Bryony James – cello
 Rosie Danvers – cello, string arrangement
 Annette Bowen – choir
 Becky Thomas – choir, vocal arrangement
 Christina Matovu – choir
 Dawn Connie Morton-Young – choir
 Josie Nugent – choir
 Kiing Gardner – choir
 Lawrence Rowe – choir
 Olivia Leisk – choir
 Red Farrell – choir
 Simons Brown – choir
 Richard Pryce – double bass
 Tommy Danvers – keyboards
 Emma Owens – viola
 Meghan Cassidy – viola
 Ellie Stanford – violin
 Hayley Pomfrett – violin
 Jenny Sacha – violin
 Patrick Kiernan – violin
 Sarah Sexton – violin
 Steve Morris – violin
 Zara Benyounes – violin
 Oli Morris - saxophone 

Technical
 Sam Moses – mastering
 Matt Huber – mixing
 Nick Taylor – string engineering

Artwork
 Jimmy Turrell – artwork
 Shea McChrsytal – design, layout
 Olivia Lifungula – photography

Charts

References

2022 albums
Chrysalis Records albums
Emeli Sandé albums